Grant McLean, CM (April 7, 1921 – December 19, 2002) was a Canadian film director and producer. For most of his professional career he worked with the National Film Board of Canada (NFB), serving as its acting Commissioner for a period during the 1960s.

McLean was born in Yorkton, Saskatchewan. His father Allan Grant McLean was a grain commissioner and Liberal Party politician, and his uncle Ross McLean also served as chairman of the NFB.

McLean studied at the University of Toronto, before joining the NFB in 1941 as a cameraman. One of the notable productions he worked on during World War II was the documentary Target Berlin for the Canada Carries On series, which showed the building of the first Lancaster bomber to be made in Canada, with McLean later flying in the plane to capture footage of a bombing raid over Berlin in Germany. He became a film director in 1947, with his first production in this capacity being The People Between, a documentary about the Chinese Civil War. For this film he became the first Western cameraman to film Mao Zedong. He later claimed that he had not liked Mao, although he had been friendly with Zhou Enlai, whose support had been vital in enabling him to travel freely across China in the making of the film. However, The People Between was banned by the Canadian government, under pressure from the Government of the United States, due to its balanced portrayal of Communism. Some of the footage was used in the NFB documentary China in Need, and the film itself received a limited release in Europe.

McLean continued to direct films for the NFB into the 1950s, and two of his documentaries won Canadian Film Awards; 1953's Farewell Oak Street and 1955's High Tide in Newfoundland. He then became a producer, working on the Perspective series of documentaries. In 1957 he was appointed as Assistant Film Commissioner and Director of Production at the NFB. In this capacity he was responsible, in the early 1960s, for the NFB creating its first regional offices across Canada. In 1961 took the decision to assign four controversial French Canadian filmmakers who had previously been dismissed from Board by Fernand Dansereau, the executive producer of French language productions, to work together in the NFB's Studio G unit. These filmmakers were Claude Fournier, Michel Brault, Gilles Carle and Gilles Groulx.

In March 1966, the Government Film Commissioner and Chairman of the NFB Guy Roberge resigned from his position. Judy LaMarsh, the Secretary of State, appointed McLean as his acting replacement. When LaMarsh sought the advice of NFB founder John Grierson as to who should succeed Roberge on a full-time basis, he suggested that either McLean or Sydney Newman were the only viable replacements. However, Marsh instead chose to give the job to Hugo McPherson, who was appointed in May 1967.

During McLean's brief time in charge of the NFB, the Board's most noted achievement was the production of the innovative multi-screen film In the Labyrinth for the Expo 67 exhibition in Montreal. Soon after McPherson's arrival as head of the NFB, however, the new Commissioner announced plans to restructure senior levels of the organisation and replace his two assistants and a wider group; McLean, one of these two assistants, resigned from the NFB.

After leaving the NFB in 1967, McLean established McLean-Wilder Associates, his own distribution company; this was later renamed the Visual Education Centre. In 2002 he was appointed a Member of the Order of Canada; he died in Toronto later that year. He was survived by his second wife, Betty, and daughter Lenore, from his first marriage to Frances Keith McLean.

Footnotes

References

External links

Government Film Commissioners and Chairpersons of the National Film Board of Canada
University of Toronto alumni
1921 births
2002 deaths
People from Yorkton
Members of the Order of Canada
Canadian documentary film directors
Canadian documentary film producers
Canadian Screen Award winners